Bendigo International can refer to several sporting events:

 Bendigo International (badminton), a badminton tournament
 Bendigo International (tennis), a ITF and ATP tennis tournament